Julia Turshen (born 1985) is an American bestselling cookbook author, food writer, cook, and food equity advocate. She lectures on food and home cooking and has published four solo books on the subject and has contributed to many others in collaboration or as a writer. Those she has collaborated with include Gwyneth Paltrow, Dana Cowin, and Mario Batali. She hosts the podcast Keep Calm and Cook On and writes a monthly column in Food & Wine called The Interview. She has written for the New York Times, Condé Nast Traveler, Vogue, and Bon Appétit. She serves on the Smithsonian National Museum of American History's Kitchen Cabinet Advisory Board and is the founder of Equity At The Table (EATT), a digital directory of people of color, women, and non-binary individuals in food. She also regularly provides meals for Citizen Action of New York, which led to her 2016 appointment as developer of the organization's food team.

Early life
Turshen grew up with one brother in a liberal, secular New York Jewish household. Her parents were workaholics; (Queery podcast, 12:20) her mother was an art director and her father was a graphic designer. Turshen wanted to work on cookbooks from a young age, always poring over cookbooks with great interest. At age 13, she even opened a mini restaurant in her family's home. Her maternal grandparents, refugees to the United States, owned a bread bakery in Brooklyn, which Turshen's mother grew up in. Though she never met her grandparents, Turshen believes these roots created a "hereditary, genetic" (Queery podcast, 10:08) pull toward cooking within her. As her parents did not cook much, she taught herself with the help of books and the pre-Food Network television landscape of Julia Child and the Discovery Channel's Great Chefs show. In between high school and college, Turshen worked at Kneaded Bread Bakery in Port Chester, New York.

Education
Turshen did not attend culinary school; rather, she attended Manhattan's all-women's school, Barnard College, where she studied poetry and majored in English. During her tenure, she interned for a food magazine, a cookbook author, and a food show television producer. She ended up working for the producer part-time while still in school. (Queery podcast, 19:06)

Career
Turshen was hired right out of college, by the television producer for whom she had interned and worked, to serve as assistant to a writer who had been hired to write the companion book for a PBS travel show about food and cooking. (Queery podcast, 19:40) The job was in Spain, and Turshen bought a one-way ticket there. When the writer dropped out of the project, Turshen was afforded the opportunity to write the book herself, and she did. Next, she co-authored and otherwise collaborated on approximately ten cookbooks, ranging from a Korean cookbook to a Vietnamese cookbook to a cookbook about breads from around the world (Queery podcast, 30:40), supplementing her meager income by working as a private chef for wealthy clients. (Queery podcast, 25:26) Using her experiences, Turshen published her first solo book of recipes and stories in September 2016. (Queery podcast, 28:35)

In 2016, Turshen released her first solo cookbook, Small Victories: Recipes, Advice + Hundreds of Ideas for Home Cooking Triumphs. It was listed as one of The New York Times''' best cookbooks of that year, one of NPR's best cookbooks of that year, and one of the best cookbooks for holiday giving, according to the Boston Globe.

In 2017, Turshen released Feed the Resistance: Recipes + Ideas for Getting Involved, whose proceeds she donated to the ACLU. The book was a meditation on food and activism. It went on to earn Eater's Best Cookbook of 2017. The San Francisco Chronicle lauded it as one of their picks for best cookbooks of 2017 and The Village Voice included it on their list 2017's Best Food Books for Woke Readers (and Eaters).

In 2018, Turshen's book Now & Again: Go-To Recipes, Inspired Menus + Endless Ideas for Reinventing Leftovers was nominated for a Goodreads Choice Award in the category of Best Food & Cookbooks.

In 2019, Turshen's podcast, Keep Calm and Cook On, was nominated for an International Association of Culinary Professionals Award.

Lectures

Turshen has given talks or served as moderator at venues such as the Brooklyn's Museum of Food & Drink, the University of Michigan, New Orleans' Dillard University, The New York Times Food Festival, the National Museum of American History, the Philly Chef Conference, and 
the William Vale Hotel.

She has also been featured on Google Talks, NPR, KCRW, and PRX.

Awards
Eater's Best Cookbook of 2017

Personal life
Turshen is married to Design Sponge founder Grace Bonney. The couple lived in Greenpoint, Brooklyn and had a vacation home in Ulster County, New York. In 2014, they and their dogs moved into the vacation home, an 1850s farmhouse, full-time.

Bibliography
Solo projectsNow & Again: Go-To Recipes, Inspired Menus + Endless Ideas for Reinventing Leftovers (2018)Feed the Resistance: Recipes + Ideas for Getting Involved (2017)Small Victories: Recipes, Advice + Hundreds of Ideas for Home Cooking Triumphs (2016)Simply Julia: 110 Easy Recipes for Healthy Comfort Food (2021)

CollaborationsElizabeth Street Cafe by Julia Turshen, Larry McGuire, and Tom Moorman (2017)The Hot Bread Kitchen Cookbook: Artisanal Baking from Around the World Jessamyn Rodriguez and Julia Turshen (2015)It's All Good by Gwyneth Paltrow and Julia Turshen
 Buvette: The Pleasure of Good Food'' by Jody Williams with Julia Turshen

References

American chefs
American cookbook writers
American LGBT writers
LGBT people from New York (state)
1985 births
Barnard College alumni
Writers from New York City
American women chefs
Women cookbook writers
21st-century American non-fiction writers
21st-century American women writers
American women non-fiction writers
Living people
LGBT chefs